Houlton School is a co-educational secondary school and sixth form located in Houlton, Warwickshire, England. The school's buildings have been developed on the historic site of the Rugby Radio Station. Designed to serve 1100 students, the school opened on 1 September 2021 with its first cohort of 180 year 7 students.

History 
Houlton School in Rugby, Warwickshire, is located on the grounds of the Rugby Radio Station, which was established in 1928. According to developer Morgan Sindall Construction, the station "at the height of its power in the mid-20th century, was the largest in the world. In 1927 the site transmitted the first transatlantic radio signal." The station was phased out between 2003 and 2007, and it became a Grade II-listed site on the National Heritage List for England in February 2005.

Van Heyningen and Haward Architects created the plan that transformed the former Rugby Radio Station power building and its water tower, and added three new teaching blocks. Morgan Sindall Construction received a £39 million commission to convert the radio station into a secondary school that would "provide more than 1,000 pupils with a modern 123,100 square foot learning environment." According to Morgan Sindall, the former power room was converted into an assembly hall and canteen, retaining many of its original features. They removed the roof, retaining the walls, then inserted a steel frame to create additional floors within the building. In addition, the project restored the façades of the listed building while preserving "the industrial character of the main internal spaces."

Richard Coppell, development director for Urban&Civic, said, "The transformation of this landmark building is a welcomed signal of progress and optimism for the local community who are rightly excited about the unique and inspiring school for their children, only a short stroll from home."

In February 2021, Houlton School was approved by the government's education secretary to open in September 2021.

Admissions 

Houlton is an independent academy, not affiliated with the local district. Houlton requires no tuition fees. Pupils may apply to enroll as long as they are able to commute to school daily. Students who have a sibling already attending or who live in close proximity to Houlton School have a greater chance of admission.

Curriculum 
Students at Houlton school study the "full National Curriculum" and the core academic qualifications of the English Baccalaureate. The school plans to offer a "range of applied, employer-focused qualifications, including digital broadcast and new media" at grades 10 and 11.

The reconstructed five-storey building provides "art space, drama and dance studios, music room and sixth form social space".

According to the Transforming Lives Educational Trust, which has operating responsibilities for the Houlton School, the site will also have:

Co-curricular offerings 
Multiple different clubs both during and after school hours offer students opportunities for co-curricular education. These clubs include sports, arts, and sciences, and are all taught by existing teaching staff.

Partner schools 
Houlton School has three partner schools: Henry Hinde Infant School, Henry Hinde Junior School and Ashlawn School. These partner schools are all affiliated with the Transforming Lives Educational Trust.

References

External links 
 Official website

Secondary schools in Warwickshire
Free schools in England
2021 establishments in England
Educational institutions established in 2021